Pavel Mif was the pseudonym of Mikhail Alexandrovich Fortus (August 3, 1901, in Khersones Gubernia of Russian Empire - 10 September 1939), a Ukrainian and Russian Bolshevik party member from May 1917 of Jewish descent, a historian with a doctor's degree in economics (1935), participant in the Russian civil war (1918–20), a student at Yakov Sverdlov Communist University (1920–21), did communist party work in Ukraine (1923–25), pro-rector of Sun Yat-sen Communist University of the Toilers of China (Moscow) under Karl Radek from 1925, rector of the same institution after 1927, member of the Executive Council of Comintern concurrently, participant of the 5th (1927), 6th (1928) Congresses of the Communist Party of China and the 4th Plenary meeting of its Central Committee (1931). Mif was arrested by the NKVD on December 11, 1937, and sentenced to death in July 1938 for "membership in a counter-revolutionary terrorist organization". He was executed on September 10, 1939. In the year 1956, following the denouncement of Stalinism by premier Nikita Khrushchev, he was fully (posthumously) rehabilitated.

References

1901 births
1939 deaths
Comintern people
Delegates to the 5th National Congress of the Chinese Communist Party
Delegates to the 6th National Congress of the Chinese Communist Party
Great Purge victims from Ukraine
Jewish socialists
Old Bolsheviks
People from Khersonsky Uyezd
Soviet academics
Soviet Jews
Soviet politicians
Soviet rehabilitations
Academic staff of Sun Yat-sen University